Colasposoma senegalense is a species of leaf beetle found in Senegal and the Democratic Republic of the Congo. It was first described from Senegal by François-Louis Laporte in 1833.

References 

senegalense
Beetles of Africa
Beetles of the Democratic Republic of the Congo
Insects of West Africa
Beetles described in 1833
Taxa named by François-Louis Laporte, comte de Castelnau